Antynanum is a townland in County Antrim, Northern Ireland. It is situated in the historic barony of Antrim Lower and the civil parish of Racavan and covers an area of 450 acres.

The name derives from the Irish: An Tidh na nama (The church of the soul).

The population of the townland increased during the 19th century:

The townland contains a Scheduled Historic Monument: a court tomb (grid ref: D2556 1094). The Neolithic court tomb is set in a cairn 60–70 metres long running east–west and 3 metres tall at the west end. The semicircular court, at the west end, leads into a 7 metre long two-chambered gallery. The burial chambers are largely filled with cairn material. At the east end of the cairn is a single-chambered tomb with portal and displaced capstone.

See also 
List of townlands in County Antrim
List of archaeological sites in County Antrim

References

Townlands of County Antrim
Barony of Antrim Lower
Archaeological sites in County Antrim